Wilfred Baddeley (11 January 1872 – 24 January 1929) was a British male tennis player and the elder of the Baddeley twins.

Career 

Wilfred, the better-known competitor, made his debut at Wimbledon in 1889 and he went on to win singles title three times in 1891, 1892 and 1895. His 6–4, 1–6, 7–5, 6–0 win over Joshua Pim in 1891 at the age of 19 years and five months made him, until Boris Becker in 1985, the youngest men's singles champion at Wimbledon. He was also runner-up in 1893, 1894 and 1896. With Herbert, he won four doubles championships at Wimbledon in 1891, 1894 – 1896. The twins retired from competitive lawn tennis after the 1897 Wimbledon Championships to pursue their law careers but made a reappearance in the doubles event at Wimbledon in 1904 and 1905. In total he participated in eight Wimbledon singles tournaments and eleven doubles tournaments between 1889 and 1905.

Baddeley was inducted into the International Tennis Hall of Fame in 2013.

Professional life 
In February 1895 the brothers qualified in London as solicitors. They joined their uncle and father Thomas and E. P. Baddeley in Leadenhall Street at the family firm, founded by their great grandfather in 1790. The brothers remained partners in the firm until 1919, when they retired leaving their cousin, Cyril Baddeley, to carry on in the family name.

Grand Slam finals

Singles: 6 (3 titles, 3 runners-up)

Doubles: 6 (4 titles, 2 runner-ups)

References

External links
 

1872 births
1929 deaths
19th-century English people
19th-century male tennis players
English businesspeople
English male tennis players
People from Bromley
Tennis people from Greater London
Wimbledon champions (pre-Open Era)
Twin sportspeople
English twins
Grand Slam (tennis) champions in men's singles
Grand Slam (tennis) champions in men's doubles
International Tennis Hall of Fame inductees
British male tennis players